The 1998 New England Patriots season was the franchise's 29th season in the National Football League and the 39th overall. They finished with a 9–7 record, losing in the first round of the playoffs to the Jacksonville Jaguars.

In the offseason, the Patriots tendered restricted free agent running back Curtis Martin with the highest possible tender, which would return the Patriots first- and third-round draft picks if any team were to sign him and the Patriots were to decide not to match the offer. Fueling the rivalry between the two teams, the New York Jets and head coach Bill Parcells, who had resigned from the Patriots two years earlier, signed Martin, the 1995 NFL Offensive Rookie of the Year, and per restricted free agency rules ceded their first- and third-round picks in the 1998 NFL Draft to the Patriots. With the first-round pick the Patriots selected another running back Robert Edwards, who rushed for over 1,000 yards in his rookie campaign. Suffering a broken finger in November, veteran quarterback Drew Bledsoe was unable to start the team's final two regular season games and was replaced by Scott Zolak. With a 9–7 record the Patriots finished fourth in the AFC East but earned a sixth seed in the AFC playoffs. With Zolak still at the helm, the Patriots were defeated on the road by the Jacksonville Jaguars, the second straight playoff defeat for second-year head coach Pete Carroll, and is one of only two games the Patriots have ever lost to the Jaguars, the second being in 2018.

As of the 2022 NFL season, this remains the last time that a team with a fourth-place finish in its division made the playoffs.

1998 NFL Draft

Undrafted free agents

Staff

Regular season

Schedule

Standings

Playoffs

Notable games
September 13 vs. Indianapolis Colts:
The Peyton Manning/New England Patriots rivalry kicked off with a 29–6 rout of Manning's Colts.  Ty Law ran back a first-quarter interception 59 yards for the game's first touchdown, while Terry Glenn's three-yard catch and Robert Edwards' one-yard run went with three field goals by future Colt Adam Vinatieri for the Pats.  Torrance Small caught a touchdown from Manning in the final five minutes for the only score by the Colts.  Manning ended the day with three picks returned for 71 yards.

September 20 vs. Tennessee Oilers:
In their final season using the team nickname "Oilers", the future Tennessee Titans put on a hard challenge for the Patriots, as Eddie George rushed for 100 yards and caught a 22-yard touchdown from Steve McNair.  Al Del Greco and Adam Vinatieri exchanged field goals in the first half and the game lead tied or changed seven times before Lawyer Milloy picked off McNair for a 30-yard fourth-quarter touchdown sealing a 27–16 Patriots win.

October 4 at New Orleans Saints:
Two seasons since losing Super Bowl XXXI in New Orleans the Patriots made their first trip to the Louisiana Superdome; coincidentally, the coach they were facing was the one who'd crushed them in Super Bowl XX in that same building – Mike Ditka.  Drew Bledsoe overcame three interceptions and led the Patriots to a 27–24 lead in the game's final four minutes.  On a Patriots punt Tebucky Jones of the Patriots tried to down the ball before it went into the endzone; Earl Little of the Saints grabbed it in the endzone but as he went to his knees his teammate Andre Hastings yanked it out of his hands and returned the kick 76 yards, setting up the tying field goal with 1:29 left in regulation.  Bledsoe then led the Patriots downfield and Adam Vinatieri kicked the game-winning field goal with three seconds left in a 30–27 Patriots win.

November 23 vs. Miami Dolphins: 
Several days before this Monday Night Football matchup came word that team owner Robert Kraft had secured a stadium deal in Hartford, Connecticut for 2001 (a deal subsequently aborted when a deal to build Gillette Stadium was completed).  Though the fanbase was displeased, their support for the team didn't waver even as the Patriots fell behind 23–19 with 3:22 left in the fourth after a Karim Abdul-Jabbar rushing touchdown.  On the ensuing Patriots possession, Bledsoe completed a first-down pass on fourth and ten, but later broke the index finger on his throwing hand after striking Todd Rucci's helmet; on another fourth-and-ten on the Dolphins 35-yard-line coach Pete Carroll tried to call timeout, but the Patriots didn't see him and Bledsoe completed the first-down throw to Ben Coates.  He then found Shawn Jefferson for the game-winning touchdown with 29 seconds remaining, in a 26–23 Patriots final score.

November 29 vs. Buffalo Bills:
Local hero Doug Flutie made his first visit to Foxboro Stadium since his days as Patriots quarterback, where he'd won all five starts there.  Directing the Bills he threw for 339 yards and rushed for 30 more, leading the Bills to a 21–17 lead in the game's final minute.  From there, and despite still nursing a broken finger on his throwing hand, Drew Bledsoe led the Patriots downfield and completed a fourth-down throw to the Bills 26 to Shawn Jefferson with six seconds remaining.  There was a referee conference after the play regarding the spot of the ball, at which point one of the referees was heard to say "just give it to them", in reference to the first down. Bledsoe threw for the endzone on the next play but the ball fell incomplete; the Bills were flagged for pass interference, extending the game by one untimed down, and from the one-yard line Bledsoe lofted a play-action pass to Ben Coates for the winning touchdown.  The disgusted Bills (who felt Jefferson was out of bounds on the catch at the 26) went to the locker room even though the extra point still had to be kicked; Adam Vinatieri thus ran in an unopposed two-point conversion for a 25–21 Patriots win, the first career loss in Foxboro for Flutie. The NFL later stated that the game-extending pass interference call was an erroneous decision by the referees.

December 13 at St. Louis Rams:
Drew Bledsoe's season ended in a 32–18 loss at St. Louis.   Bledsoe played the entire game other than several series to get the splint on his broken finger replaced; he completed only 11 of 35 passes; a pass in the first quarter bounced off Lovett Purnell and was intercepted by Todd Lyght.   Scott Zolak was sacked and fumbled to former Patriot Ray Agnew.   The game was costly for both teams as Terry Glenn and Rams quarterback Tony Banks were lost to injuries.

Final roster

References

External links
Season page on Pro Football Reference

New England Patriots
New England Patriots seasons
New England Patriots
Sports competitions in Foxborough, Massachusetts